Duse Bay is a bay indenting the south side of Trinity Peninsula between View Point and the western side of Tabarin Peninsula. It was discovered by a party under J. Gunnar Andersson, of the Swedish Antarctic Expedition, 1901–04, and was named by Otto Nordenskiöld, the leader of that expedition, for Lieutenant S.A. Duse.

References 

 

Bays of Trinity Peninsula